That French Lady is a lost 1924 silent film romance drama directed by Edmund Mortimer  and starring Shirley Mason. It was produced and distributed by Fox Film Corporation.

It was based on a play by William Hurlbut, The Strange Woman and was played on Broadway in 1913 by Elsie Ferguson.

Cast
Shirley Mason - Inez de Pierrefond
Theodore von Eltz - John Hemmingway
Harold Goodwin - Charlie Abbey
Charles Coleman - Uncle Walter

See also
1937 Fox vault fire

References

External links
 That French Lady at IMDb.com

lobby poster

1924 films
American silent feature films
Lost American films
Films directed by Edmund Mortimer
Fox Film films
American black-and-white films
American romantic drama films
1924 romantic drama films
1920s American films
Silent romantic drama films
Silent American drama films